Bassim al-Ansar (born 1970) is an Iraqi poet. Born in Baghdad, he studied business at Al-Mustansiriya University. He started publishing poetry in the early 1990s. Although living in Denmark since the late 1990s, Bassim continues to write and publish poetry in Arabic. His first book of poetry titled The Hymns of the Son of Adam came out in 2007. He was named as one of the Beirut39 group of young Arab writers in 2010.

References

21st-century Iraqi poets
1970 births
Living people
Date of birth missing (living people)
Writers from Baghdad
Al-Mustansiriya University alumni